Life Happened is the second studio album by American country music artist Tammy Cochran. It was released in 2002 by Epic Records and peaked at #11 on the Billboard Top Country Albums chart. The album includes the singles "Life Happened," "Love Won't Let Me" and "What Kind of Woman Would I Be."

Track listing

Personnel

 Eddie Bayers – drums
 Richard Bennett – acoustic guitar
 Joe Chemay – bass guitar
 Lisa Cochran – background vocals
 Tammy Cochran – lead vocals
 Melodie Crittenden – background vocals
 Eric Darken – congas, tambourine, vibraphone
 Dan Dugmore – electric guitar, steel guitar
 Glen Duncan – fiddle, mandolin
 Paul Franklin – steel guitar
 Carl Gorodetzky – violin
 David Grissom – electric guitar
 Jim Grosjean – viola
 Tony Harrell – synthesizer
 Aubrey Haynie – fiddle
 Wes Hightower – background vocals
 John Barlow Jarvis – keyboards, Hammond organ, piano
 Randy Kohrs – Dobro
 Paul Leim – drums, percussion
 B. James Lowry – acoustic guitar
 Anthony Martin – background vocals
 Bob Mason – cello
 Brent Mason – electric guitar
 Steve Nathan – keyboards, piano
 Matt Rollings – piano
 Jason Sellers – background vocals
 Pam Sixfin – violin
 Bryan Sutton – acoustic guitar
 Russell Terrell – background vocals
 Neil Thrasher – background vocals
 Billy Joe Walker Jr. – acoustic guitar, electric guitar
 Biff Watson – acoustic guitar
 Dennis Wilson – background vocals
 Glenn Worf – bass guitar
 Curtis Young – background vocals
 Reggie Young – electric guitar

Chart performance

References
[ Life Happened] at Allmusic

2002 albums
Tammy Cochran albums
Epic Records albums
Albums produced by Blake Chancey
Albums produced by Billy Joe Walker Jr.